David Holdridge (born February 5, 1969) is an American former professional baseball pitcher. He also played in the California Angels and Philadelphia Phillies organizations.

References 

1969 births
Living people
American expatriate baseball players in Canada
Baseball players at the 1999 Pan American Games
Baseball players from Michigan
Clearwater Phillies players
Lake Elsinore Storm players
Major League Baseball pitchers
Memphis Chicks players
Midland Angels players
Pan American Games medalists in baseball
Pan American Games silver medalists for the United States
Palm Springs Angels players
People from Wayne, Michigan
Quad Cities Angels players
Reading Phillies players
Seattle Mariners players
Tacoma Rainiers players
United States national baseball team players
Vancouver Canadians players
Medalists at the 1999 Pan American Games